Vaibhav Madhukar Pichad is an Indian politician from Ahmednagar district. He was a Member of the 13th Maharashtra Legislative Assembly from Akole Vidhan Sabha constituency which is reserved for the candidates belonging to the Schedule Tribes. He was a Member of the Legislative Assembly in Maharashtra from Nationalist Congress Party. In 2019 he left Nationalist Congress Party and joined Bhartiya Janata Party. Currently, he is working as National Minister BJP Scheduled Tribes Morcha.

Early life 
Vaibhav Pichad was born on 27 April 1974. His father Madhukar Pichad was also a Member of the Legislative Assembly in Maharashtra from Akole Assembly Constituency and Tribal Minister of Maharashtra. Vaibhav Pichad is a key figure in the cooperative movement and is the chairman of a Co-Operative Milk Union Amrutsagar. Pichad was also a former member of Ahmednagar Zila Parishad.

Political career 
Vaibhav Pichad began his political career in the year 2000 as Youth President of the Nationalist Congress Party in Akole. In the year 2002, Vaibhav Pichad was elected as a Member of Zila Parishad Ahmednagar. In 2014, Pichad won Maharashtra State Legislative Assembly Election. In 2021, Vaibhav Pichad appointed as National Minister BJP Scheduled Tribes Morcha.

Political statistics

Positions held 

 2000 - Youth President of Nationalist Congress Party Akole
 2002 - Member of Ahmednagar Zila Parishad.
 2014 - 2019 - Member Maharashtra State Legislative Assembly
 2021 - National Minister Bhartiya Janata Party Scheduled Tribes Morcha
 2022 - Director of Maharashtra State Cooperative Milk Federation(Mahananda)
 2022 - Chairman of Co-Operative Milk Union Amrutsagar

References 

Maharashtra MLAs 2014–2019
Nationalist Congress Party politicians from Maharashtra
People from Ahmednagar district
Living people
Marathi politicians
Bharatiya Janata Party politicians from Maharashtra
1974 births